Tsulukidze is a Georgian surname. 

People with the surname Tsulukidze include:

the Tsulukidze family, a noble family in Georgia
Alexander Tsulukidze
Giorgi Tsulukidze
Varden Tsulukidze

Georgian-language surnames